Aleksandar Jovanović may refer to:

Aleksandar Jovanović (footballer, born 1984), Bosnian Serb association football player
Aleksandar Jovanović (footballer, born 1985), Serbian association football midfielder
Aleksandar Jovanović (footballer, born 1989), Australian association football player
Aleksandar Jovanović (footballer, born July 1992), Serbian association football goalkeeper
Aleksandar Jovanović (footballer, born December 1992), Serbian association football goalkeeper
Aleksandar Jovanović (politician) (born 1976), Serbian politician
Aleksandar Jovanović (journalist) (born 1968), Serbian journalist (who is also a politician)
Aleksandar Jovanovic, an actor who has acted in the film The Titan

See also
Aleksa Jovanović (disambiguation)
Jovanović (surname)